In cryptography, a secret sharing scheme is publicly verifiable (PVSS) if it is a verifiable secret sharing scheme and if any party (not just the participants of the protocol) can verify the validity of the shares distributed by the dealer.

The method introduced here according to the paper by Chunming Tang, Dingyi Pei, Zhuo Liu, and Yong He is non-interactive and maintains this property throughout the protocol.

Initialization
The PVSS scheme dictates an initialization process in which: 
All system parameters are generated.
Each participant must have a registered public key.

Excluding the initialization process, the PVSS consists of two phases:

Distribution
1. Distribution of secret  shares is performed by the dealer , which does the following:
 The dealer creates  for each participant  respectively.
 The dealer publishes the encrypted share  for each .
 The dealer also publishes a string  to show that each  encrypts 
(note:  guarantees that the reconstruction protocol will result in the same .

2. Verification of the shares:
 Anybody knowing the public keys for the encryption methods , can verify the shares.
 If one or more verifications fails the dealer fails and the protocol is aborted.

Reconstruction
1. Decryption of the shares:
 The Participants  decrypts their share of the secret  using .
(note: fault-tolerance can be allowed here: it's not required that all participants succeed in decrypting  as long as a qualified set of participants are successful to decrypt ).
 The participant release  plus a string  this shows the released share is correct.

2. Pooling the shares:
 Using the strings  to exclude the participants which are dishonest or failed to decrypt .
 Reconstruction  can be done from the shares of any qualified set of participants.

Chaum-Pedersen Protocol
A proposed protocol proving:  :
The prover chooses a random 
The verifier sends a random challenge 
The prover responds with 
The verifier checks  and 

Denote this protocol as: 
The prover chooses a random  and sends  and 
The verifier sends a random challenge .
The verifier checks  and 

The Chaum-Pedersen protocol is an interactive method and needs some modification to be used in a non-interactive way:

See also
 Verifiable secret sharing

References
 Markus Stadler, Publicly Verifiable Secret Sharing
 Berry Schoenmakers, A Simple Publicly Verifiable Secret Sharing Scheme and its Application to Electronic Voting, Advances in Cryptology—CRYPTO, 1999, pp. 148–164

Applications of cryptography